Kanti Children's Hospital (Kanti Baal Aspatal) is a pediatric hospital in Maharajgunj, Kathmandu, Nepal. The hospital is administered and regulated by the Kanti Children's Hospital Development Board, an autonomous body under the Ministry of Health, Government of Nepal.

The hospital treats children from all over the country and other hospitals. It has a capacity of 350 beds. There are 36 pediatricians, 8 pediatric surgeons, 45 medical officers, 84 general nurses, 25 technicians and paramedics and 107 support staff. The hospital also runs a Post Graduate Degree class with accreditation from National Academy of Medical Education and Sciences (NAMS), Nepal.

History
The hospital was established in 1963 with support from the government of the USSR, as a general hospital with fifty beds. In 1968 Kanti Hospital was handed over to the Ministry of Health of Nepal by the USSR government. From 1970 the hospital started providing its services for treatment of children up to the age of 14.

Faculties
 Pediatric Medicine
 Pediatric Surgery
 Pediatric Orthopedics
 Pediatric Dermatology
 Emergency Facilities
 Physiotherapy
 Nutrition Room
 Vaccination Room
 Records Section
 Library

Special wards
 Burn Ward
 Oncology Ward
 Cardiac Ward
 Pediatric Intensive Care Unit (PICU)
 Neonatal Intensive Care Unit (NICU)
 Surgical Intensive Care Unit (SICU)
 Neonatal Intermediate Care Unit (NIMCU)
 Post Operative Ward

Controversy
The hospital has become a target for drug users. Toilets of the hospital are being used by drug addicts as a hide out to use drugs. However, the government of Nepal and hospital management have not taken any action against it.

References

Hospital buildings completed in 1963
Hospitals in Nepal
Hospitals established in 1963
1963 establishments in Nepal